Punta Lingua Lighthouse is an active lighthouse located on the south eastern tip of the island of Salina, which makes part of the Aeolian Islands, in the municipality of Santa Marina Salina on the Tyrrhenian Sea.

History
The lighthouse, built in 1953, over the years went into ruin and in November 2009, due to a violent storm, the balcony collapsed and the area was closed. In 2011 the municipality concluded an agreement, with the Agenzia del Demanio, to obtain the management of the keeper's house, which has been restored in order to house the Museum of the Sea.

Description
The tower, the building and the lantern are white, the lantern dome is grey metallic. The lighthouse is completely automated and managed by the Marina Militare with the identification code number 3300 E.F.

See also
 List of lighthouses in Italy
 Santa Marina Salina

References

External links
 Servizio Fari Marina Militare
 Picture of the lighthouse restored

Lighthouses in Italy
Buildings and structures in Sicily